Nantucket Sound is a roughly triangular area of the Atlantic Ocean offshore from the U.S. state of Massachusetts. Between Cape Cod and Martha's Vineyard it is connected to the Vineyard Sound. Ports on Nantucket Sound include Nantucket and Hyannis, Massachusetts.

Nantucket Sound possesses significant marine habitat for a diversity of ecologically and economically important species. "The Sound" has particular significance for several federally protected species of wildlife and a variety of commercially and recreationally valuable fisheries.

The Sound is located at a confluence of the cold Labrador Currents and the warm Gulf Stream. This creates a unique coastal habitat representing the southern range for Northern Atlantic species and the northern range for Mid-Atlantic species. Nantucket Sound has much biological diversity and contains habitats that range from open sea to salt marshes, as well as warm-water beaches on the Cape and Islands coasts.

See also
 The Woods Hole, Martha's Vineyard and Nantucket Steamship Authority—providing ferry service in the Sound
 Wind Over Water—A documentary film about the wind farm proposed for Nantucket Sound.

References

External links
Two Tidal Projects Gain Speed in Energy Development Race

Bodies of water of Barnstable County, Massachusetts
Geography of Nantucket, Massachusetts
Geography of Martha's Vineyard
Massachusetts natural resources
Sounds of Massachusetts